Schwartziella typica is a species of minute sea snail, a marine gastropod micromollusk in the family Zebinidae.

Description
The height of the shell attains 3.8 mm.

Distribution
This species occurs in the Atlantic Ocean off the Cape Verdes.

References

 Rolán E. & Luque Á.A. 2000. The subfamily Rissoininae (Mollusca: Gastropoda: Rissoidae) in the Cape Verde Archipelago (West África). Iberus 18(1): 21-94
 Rolán E., 2005. Malacological Fauna From The Cape Verde Archipelago. Part 1, Polyplacophora and Gastropoda.

typica
Gastropods described in 2000